Quinn Jamal Peters (born December 22, 1996) is a professional American football defensive back for the Atlanta Falcons of the National Football League (NFL). He played college football at Mississippi State.

College career 
Peters played college football for the Mississippi State Bulldogs from 2015 to 2018. He played in 46 games where he had 99 tackles, 3.5 tackles for a loss, three interceptions, one sack, and two forced fumbles.

Professional career

Indianapolis Colts 
After going undrafted in the 2019 NFL Draft, Peters signed with the Indianapolis Colts on May 4, 2019. However, he was released following an injury settlement on May 14, 2019.

Toronto Argonauts 
Peters remained unsigned in 2020 and was eventually signed by the Toronto Argonauts on February 2, 2021. He began the 2021 season on the practice roster, but was elevated to the active roster in Week 2 and played in his first career professional game on August 13, 2021, where he had nine tackles and one interception against the Winnipeg Blue Bombers. He remained a starter on defence until he suffered a knee injury in Week 10. He sat out for the remainder of the regular season, but had played in eight games and recorded 31 defensive tackles and one interception until that point. Peters returned to play in the team's lone post-season game in the East Final where he had one defensive tackle in the loss to the Hamilton Tiger-Cats.

Atlanta Falcons
On January 9, 2023, Peters signed a reserve/future contract with the Atlanta Falcons.

Personal life
Peters was born in Hattiesburg, Mississippi to Yashica Peters. He has one brother, Gerobe Jr.

References

External links 
 Toronto Argonauts bio

1996 births
Living people
American football defensive backs
Atlanta Falcons players
Canadian football defensive backs
Indianapolis Colts players
Mississippi State Bulldogs football players
Players of American football from Mississippi
Toronto Argonauts players